Colin Cooper is a British psychologist and was a senior lecturer in the School of Psychology at Queen's University Belfast until 2012, when he took early retirement and moved to Picton, and latterly London Ontario, Canada. Cooper also devised the  multiple-choice IQ tests for the BBC television programme Test the Nation. Among the questions, Cooper said that he  had managed to "sneak in a few things that interested me", including questions "exploring the link between intelligence and genetics, height and the number of accidents they have had."

Bibliography

Books
Individual Differences and Personality (4th ed.) (2020)
Psychological Testing: theory and practice (2019)
Intelligence and Human Abilities (2015)
Individual Differences and Personality (3rd ed.) (2010)
Test the Nation: The IQ Book (2003)
Individual Differences (2nd ed.) (2002)
Intelligence and Abilities (2002)
Individual Differences (1997)

Articles

References

Year of birth missing (living people)
Living people
Academics of Queen's University Belfast
British psychologists
Alumni of the University of Exeter